TV 1893 Neuhausen is a handball club from , a quarter of Metzingen, Germany.

Crest, colours, supporters

Kits

External links
Club website

German handball clubs
Handball-Bundesliga
Sport in Baden-Württemberg